Lincoln Corrêa dos Santos (born 16 December 2000), or simply Lincoln, is a Brazilian footballer who plays for Cruzeiro on loan from Vissel Kobe as a forward or a winger.

Career

Flamengo
Lincoln made his professional debut for Flamengo at only 16 years old in a Brazilian Série A match on 19 November 2017 against Corinthians at Ilha do Urubu. He came to the field as a 65th-minute substitute as Flamengo won 3-0. One week later he played his second professional match, this time against Santos, Flamengo lost 2-1.

After Real Madrid signed Vinícius Júnior other European clubs such as Barcelona, Atletico Madrid, Manchester United, Juventus and Real Madrid started to scout Lincoln with attention as another possible future star. Some of the specialized media compared him with Polish striker Robert Lewandowski.

Lincoln scored his first goal at national level in a 2018 Copa do Brasil thrilling 1-1 match against Grêmio at Arena do Grêmio. He came to the pitch at the 77th minute and scored the equalizer at the 94th minute with a pass from Renê.

Vissel Kobe
On 20 January 2021, Lincoln signed with Japanese side Vissel Kobe.

International career

Career statistics

Honours

Club
Flamengo
Campeonato Brasileiro Série A: 2019
Campeonato Carioca: 2019, 2020
Copa Libertadores: 2019
Supercopa do Brasil: 2020
Recopa Sudamericana: 2020
FIFA Club World Cup runner-up: 2019

References

External links

2000 births
Living people
Brazilian footballers
Brazil youth international footballers
Association football forwards
Campeonato Brasileiro Série A players
Campeonato Brasileiro Série B players
Expatriate footballers in Japan
Brazilian expatriate sportspeople in Japan
J1 League players
CR Flamengo footballers
Vissel Kobe players
Cruzeiro Esporte Clube players